John Podmore (fl. 1413–1414) was an English politician.

Family
Podmore was the son of John and Joan Podmore. It is unclear if he had any connection to the town of Wells, Somerset other than being elected its MP.

Career
He was a Member (MP) of the Parliament of England for Wells in February 1413 and April 1414.

References

14th-century births
15th-century deaths
English MPs February 1413
English MPs April 1414